Gerhard Michael Frey (18 February 1933 – 19 February 2013) was a German publisher, businessman and politician. He was the chairman and main financial backer of the right-wing party Deutsche Volksunion, which he founded in 1971. He resigned as chairman in January 2009.

Biography
Gerhard Frey was born on 18 February 1933 in Cham. He studied law. In 1960 Frey received his PhD (Dr. rer. pol.) from the University of Graz, Austria. His dissertation was a study of the trade pattern between Austria and Germany. He was married to Regine Frey, with whom he had four children. His daughter Michaela (born 1965) is an attorney, his son Gerhard Jr. (born 1969) is a lawyer. Frey died on 19 February 2013, the day after his 80th birthday, in Gräfelfing near Munich.

The scholar Cas Mudde described Frey as "One of the most influential people in the German post-war extreme right scene" and a "multi-millionaire media czar who owns and publishes several newspapers".

Frey took control of the far right Deutschen Soldaten-Zeitung in 1959, later renamed National Zeitung, and raised the paper’s circulation from 27,500 in 1958 to 131,000 in 1967. The paper frequently published historical revisionist and anti-Israel articles. In 1967 it used the term desk murderer (Schreibtischtäter) referring to people who support Israel as, in its view, they thereby take the risk to become accomplices in crimes committed there.

Frey has been described as rarely generous, except at his party functions where he hosted David Irving, whom he paid generously and provided a hired luxury car for. A large amount of advertising in National Zeitung were for Frey's other businesses, thus more money than usual went back to Frey. Such businesses included Deutsche Reisen, a travel service, and the Deutsche Buchdienst, selling books, medals and flags. Frey's party, the DVU, was described as the "Frey-Party" because of its financial dependency on him. The Irish Times, after the party's success in the 1998 Saxony-Anhalt state elections, described the DVU as "less a political party than the dangerous plaything of a millionaire", without any real party structure. At the time, Frey's personal fortune was estimated to be in excess of DM 500 million.

Frey enjoyed good relations with some conservative politicians like Alfred Seidl, interior minister of Bavaria 1977-78, with European far-right and right wing leaders like Jean-Marie Le Pen and Vladimir Zhirinovsky but his relationship with other German far-right leaders was less friendly as they feared his financial power could overwhelm them.

References

Bibliography

External links

  Official Site of the National Zeitung

1933 births
2013 deaths
People from Cham, Germany
German People's Union politicians
National Democratic Party of Germany politicians
Leaders of political parties in Germany
German nationalists
20th-century German newspaper publishers (people)